Lema may refer to:

Nature

Amphibians
Lema tree frog, Hypsiboas lemai, a species of frog 
Centrolene lema, a synonym for Vitreorana gorzulae, the Bolivar giant glass frog

Insects
Kedestes lema, the Lema ranger, a butterfly
Lema (beetle), a genus of beetles in the family Chrysomelidae

Places

Benin
Lèma, Dassa-Zoumè
Lèma, Savalou

United States
Lema, California, former Pomo settlement in Mendocino County
Lake Eustis Museum of Art (LEMA), Florida

Elsewhere
Monte Lema, a mountain between Switzerland and Italy
Sierra de Lema, a mountain range in Bolívar state, Venezuela
Lema Fracture Zone, next to the Vema Fracture Zone in the Atlantic Ocean

People

People with the surname
Chris Lema (born 1995), an American soccer player
Cristian Lema (born 1990), an Argentine footballer 
Elieshi Lema (born 1949), a Tanzanian writer
Godbless Lema (born 1976), a Tanzanian politician
Nino Lema, Benigno 'Nino' Lema Mejuto (born 1964), a Spanish retired footballer 
Ray Lema, Raymond Lema A'nsi Nzinga (born 1946), a musician from Democratic Republic of the Congo
Tony Lema (1934–1966), American professional golfer

People with the given name
Lema Kusa (born 1944), a graphic artist and painter from Democratic Republic of the Congo
Lema Mabidi, (born 1993) a professional footballer from Democratic Republic of the Congo

Other uses
Lema (company), a front-company of the Civil Cooperation Bureau in Johannesburg, South Africa
LEMA, a local emergency management agency

See also
Lemma (disambiguation) 
Lemar (born 1978), a singer

Ley de Lemas, electoral law in some Spanish-speaking regions 

es:Lema
sv:Lema